Densmore William Maxon (September 30, 1820March 21, 1887) was an American farmer, Democratic politician, and Wisconsin pioneer.  He served 9 years in the Wisconsin State Assembly and 4 years in the State Senate, representing Washington County.

Background 
Maxon was born in Verona, Oneida County, New York, in 1820. He was educated at the Oneida Conference Seminary at Cazenovia, New York, and became a farmer. He moved to Wisconsin Territory in 1843, and first settled at Milwaukee and was appointed deputy county surveyor in 1843; but removed to Cedar Creek, Washington County, in 1846.

Political career 
Maxon was Town Chairman of Polk from 1846 to 1859. He was first elected a member of the Assembly in the first state legislative elections for the new state of Wisconsin, held in February 1848, and went on to serve in the 1st Wisconsin Legislature.  He was subsequently elected to another one-year term in the 5th Wisconsin Legislature (1852), and was elected to two terms as Washington County's representative in the Wisconsin Senate, serving from 1858 through 1861.

In 1865, he was the Democratic candidate for Lieutenant Governor of Wisconsin, but was defeated by Republican Wyman Spooner.  Following the 1866 redistricting, he was again elected to the State Assembly, serving six consecutive terms (1867–1873).  He was elected to a final term in 1881, receiving 797 votes to 613 votes for Republican Jacob H. Goelzer, and 72 for Greenbacker H. A. Forbes.  In 1882, he was assigned to the joint committee on charitable and penal institutions.

Outside the legislature 
In May, 1868 Maxon was appointed by President Andrew Johnson as a member of the board of visitors to attend the annual examination at the United States Military Academy at West Point. In the 1880s he was one of the Commissioners of the Wisconsin Farm Mortgage Land Company, a state commission. He died in 1887 in Santa Cruz, California, and was buried in Cedar Creek, Wisconsin.

References

External links

|-

1820 births
1887 deaths
Farmers from Wisconsin
People from Verona, New York
People from Polk, Wisconsin
Democratic Party Wisconsin state senators
Democratic Party members of the Wisconsin State Assembly
19th-century American politicians